This article is the first sub-division of Lists of Marylebone Cricket Club players. It presents an alphabetical listing of cricketers who debuted for Marylebone Cricket Club (MCC) in first-class cricket from the foundation of the club in 1787 until the end of the 1826 season. Many of the players continued to represent MCC after 1826 but they are only listed here, as it was in this period that they made their MCC debuts. 

1826 was effectively the last season in which underarm bowling prevailed; the so-called "roundarm era" began in 1827 with the roundarm trial matches. Furthermore, the major source for the period, the first volume of Arthur Haygarth's Scores & Biographies, ends in 1826 and his second volume (1827–1840) begins with the roundarm trials. All players in this list are sourced to either Scores & Biographies, Volume 1 (1744–1826) or Samuel Britcher's A list of all the principal Matches of Cricket that have been played (1790 to 1805) and not to any online source.

During this period, MCC was the sport's predominant club with sole responsibility for the Laws of cricket and it was the main organiser of important matches. The club played a major role in cricket's long-term development by sustaining it through the Napoleonic Wars and providing the leadership needed to ensure its post-war recovery; during the Napoleonic Wars there was no formal county-based structure in cricket, let alone an international one, as in the two World Wars a century later. MCC played its home matches to 1826 at its three succeeding venues in London: Lord's "Old Ground" (1787–1810), Lord's "Middle Ground" (1811–1813) and the current Lord's from 1814. Although many of the players who represented the club were members or ground staff, others were associated with county clubs or teams and appeared for MCC by invitation. MCC teams have always operated at all levels of the sport and players who represented the club in minor cricket only are out of scope here (note, however, that the sources tend to treat the majority of MCC's senior matches to 1826 as important).

The details are the player's usual name followed by the span of years in which he was active as an MCC player in important matches (the span may include years in which he played in minor matches only for MCC and/or years in which he did not represent MCC in any matches) and then his name is given as it usually appeared on match scorecards (e.g., surname preceded by all initials). In cases where the player represented significant other teams besides MCC, these are given at the end of his entry.

A
 Earl of Aboyne (1817–1843) : Earl of Aboyne (Surrey, Kent)
 Benjamin Aislabie (1808–1841) : B. Aislabie (Surrey, Kent)
 Stephen Amherst (1791) : S. Amherst (Kent, Middlesex)
 Charles Anguish (1789–1795) : C. Anguish (Surrey, Hampshire)
 Ashurst (1802–1803) : Ashurst (MCC)
 Henry Hervey Aston (1792–1793) : H. H. Aston (Hampshire, Middlesex)

B

C

D

E
 Gilbert East (1788) : G. East (Berkshire)
 Henry Everett (1818–1839) : H. Y. Everett (Hampshire)

F
 William Fennex (1791–1800) : W. Fennex (Hampshire, Kent, Middlesex, Essex)
 Henry FitzRoy (1788–1793) : H. W. FitzRoy (Hampshire, Middlesex, Surrey)
 Thomas Flavel (1822) : T. Flavel (Surrey, Players)

G
 Gates (1802–1807) : Gates (Berkshire)
 John Gibbons (1797–1803) : J. Gibbons (MCC)
 John Goldham (1791–1795) : J. Goldham (Middlesex)
 Francis Gordon (1825–1831) : F. A. Gordon (Cambridge University)
 N. Graham (1793–1803) : N. Graham (Middlesex)
 William Greenwood (1818) : W. Greenwood (MCC)
 Algernon Greville (1816–1823) : A. F. Greville (Middlesex, Hampshire)
 Charles Greville (1824–1826) : C. C. F. Greville (Gentlemen)
 J. S. Grover (1790) : J. S. Grover (MCC)

H

I
 Thomas Ingram (1792–1798) : T. Ingram (Essex)

J
 John Thomas Jones (1817) : J. T. Jones (Middlesex)

K
 Sir John Lister Kaye, 1st Baronet (1791–1798) : J. L. Kaye (Surrey)
 Henry Robert Kingscote (1823–1832) : H. R. Kingscote (Surrey, Sussex, Gentlemen)
 Douglas Kinnaird (1808–1822) : D. J. W. Kinnaird (Surrey, Middlesex)
 Edward Knight (1822–1828) : E. Knight (Hampshire)
 George T. Knight (1825–1831) : G. T. Knight (Hampshire)

L

M

N
 Molyneux Nepean, 2nd Baronet (1806–1810) : M. H. Nepean (MCC)
 Richard Newman (1793) : R. N. Newman (Essex, Kent)
 Francis Nicholas (1821–1827) : F. Nicholas (Hampshire)
 Thomas Nicoll (1818–1835) : T. Nicoll (Hampshire)
 Thomas Nicoll (1792–1796) : T. V. R. Nicoll (Middlesex)

O
 Denzil Onslow (1796–1804) : D. Onslow (MCC)
 Thomas Onslow, 2nd Earl of Onslow (1801–1808) : T. Onslow (Surrey)
 George Osbaldeston (1808–1830) : G. Osbaldeston (Sussex, Surrey, Hampshire)

P

R
 Thomas Ray (1793–1800) : T. Ray (Middlesex, Berkshire)
 Humphrey Repton (1813–1816) : H. Repton (MCC)
 James Rice (1813) : J. Rice (MCC)
 Robert Robinson (1793–1817) : R. Robinson (Surrey)
 Charles Rocke (1826–1828) : C. A. Rocke (Gentlemen)

S

T

U
 Arthur Upton (1795–1810) : A. P. Upton (Gentlemen)

V
 Viger (1814) : Viger (Surrey)
 Godfrey Vigne (1823–1849) : G. T. Vigne (Hampshire)
 Thomas Vigne (1809–1832) : T. Vigne (Surrey, Hampshire)
 C. Vivian (1816) : C. Vivian (MCC)

W

Y
 Lord Yarmouth (1797) : Lord Yarmouth (Surrey)

Notes and references

Marylebone